The hectograph, gelatin duplicator or jellygraph is a printing process that involves transfer of an original, prepared with special inks, to a pan of gelatin or a gelatin pad pulled tight on a metal frame.

While the original use of the technology has diminished, it has recently been revived for use in the art world. The hectograph has been modernized and made practical for anyone to use.

Process 
The special aniline dyes for making the master image came in the form of ink or in pens, pencils, carbon paper and even typewriter ribbon. Hectograph pencils and pens are sometimes still available. Various other inks have been found usable to varying degrees in the process; master sheets for spirit duplicators have also been pressed into service. Unlike a spirit duplicator master, a hectograph master is not a mirror image. Thus, when using a spirit duplicator master with a hectograph, one writes on the back of the purple sheet, using it like carbon paper to produce an image on the white sheet, rather than writing on the front of the white sheet to produce a mirror image on its back.

The master is placed on the gelatin and spirits applied to transfer the ink from the master to the gelatin. After transfer of the image to the inked gelatin surface, copies are made by pressing paper against it.

When a pad ceased to be useful, the gelatin could be soaked with spirits, the ink sponged away, and the pad left clean for the next master.

Storage
A grey-colored, thick, absorbent paper pad was supplied to cover the gelatin surface for storage. This also removed ink from the surface, but it took many hours to do so. Care needed to be taken that the gelatin surface was kept clean, and not damaged (e.g. by fingernails) during duplicating.

Although the name "hectograph" implies production of 100 copies, in reality the gelatin process produced print runs of somewhere between 20 and 80 copies, depending upon the skill of the user and the quality of the original. At least eight different colors of hectographic ink were available at one time, but purple was the most popular because of its density and contrast.

Historical uses

Hectography, requiring limited technology and leaving few traces behind, has been deemed useful both in low-technology environments and in clandestine circumstances where discretion was necessary. In the earlier 20th century, the process lent itself to small runs of school classroom test papers, church newsletters and science fiction fanzines. Prisoners-of-war at Stalag Luft III (the scene of The Great Escape) and at Colditz Castle during World War II used an improvised hectograph to reproduce documents for a planned escape attempt.

The Communist authorities in the Jiangsu–Anhui Border Area of China used the process for postage stamps in November 1948, produced in sheets of 35, with thirteen $50 values, six $100, twelve $200, two $300 and two $500 values.

It has also been used, though not very extensively, as an artistic medium in printmaking. The Russian Futurists used it for book illustrations, and the German expressionist Emil Nolde made four hectographs.

Stephen King, in his book On Writing, writes of how he and his elder brother Dave used the process to create their newspaper, Dave's Rag.

It was also used in professional situations; in Macy's advertising department during the 1950s and 1960s, full-page newspaper ad layouts were drawn with hectograph pencils and then duplicated on a hectograph to make file copies for future reference. Before the popularization of spirit duplicators and the mimeograph, there were mechanized hectography machines that used a drum, rather than a simple flat tray of gelatin.

In fiction 
In the final chapters of The Pothunters by P. G. Wodehouse the major characters use a jellygraph to produce a school magazine at very short notice. Wodehouse assumes his reader knows exactly what a jellygraph is and alludes to its being unattractive: "This jelly business makes one beastly sticky. I think we'll keep to print in future."

George Orwell's Keep the Aspidistra Flying (1936) describes a somewhat more subversive schoolboy publication:

Present day
While the hectograph process is obsolete for printing on paper, it is still used for making temporary tattoos on human skin. Tattoo artists use hectograph pencils to draw pictures on paper and then transfer them to the recipient's skin.

A similar method is used by nail artists and manicurists for a process called nail stamping. Nail polish is brushed onto a metal plate which is etched with a pattern. After wiping off the excess, the stamping block is pushed against the plate, picking up the polish retained by the etched area, which is then transferred to the recipient's fingernail.

It is also used to create unique acrylic paint prints. The gelatine hectograph has been commercialized by Joan Bess and Lou Ann Gleason. The hectograph has been plasticized, and made more resilient. Recipes are available on the Web for creating a printing plate from common household materials.

The basic printing technique is uncomplicated. Paint is spread over the plate with a brayer, a sheet of paper is placed over the paint, then the back of the paper is rubbed briefly and the print pulled up. The wet paint adheres to the paper. The attractive characteristics of the prints are due to the marks made in the paint before the paper is placed on the plate.

The substrate materials used for printing are diverse: any paper can be used; fabric, plastic/acetate sheets, different types of tape, cardboard, wooden boards, sheet metal, almost anything that paint will stick to can be used. The prints can be used in many different artistic applications.

See also
Spirit duplicator
Duplicating machines
List of duplicating processes

References

External links

The Scientific American Cyclopedia of Receipts, Notes and Queries (1901) p. 261 Instructions and recipes for making a hektograph.

Printmaking
Printing devices